Tsagan-Usun (Sagaan uhan) is a rural locality (a selo) in Dzhidinsky District, Republic of Buryatia, Russia. The population was 276 as of 2010. There are 6 streets.

Geography 
Tsagan-Usun is located 74 km southeast of Petropavlovka (the district's administrative centre) by road. Naushki is the nearest rural locality.

References 

Rural localities in Dzhidinsky District